The 2013 FIBA Oceania Championship for Men was the 21st edition of the tournament. The tournament featured a two-game series between Australia and New Zealand between 14 and 18 August. It also served as the qualifying tournament of FIBA Oceania for the 2014 FIBA Basketball World Cup in Spain. The first game was held in Auckland, New Zealand followed by the second game in Canberra, Australia. Australia won their 18th title in the tournament, but the two teams still advanced to the World Cup.

Venues

Rosters

|}
| valign="top" |
 Head coach
 
 Assistant coaches
 
 
 
 Team doctor
 
 Physiotherapist
 
 General manager
 

Legend
Club – describes lastclub before the tournament
Age – describes ageon 14 August 2013
|}

|}
| valign="top" |
 Head coach
 
 Assistant coach(es)
 
 
 Physiotherapist
 
 General manager
 
 Assistant manager
 

Legend
(C) Team captain
Club field describes current pro club

|}

Results

|}

Game 1
All times are local (UTC+12).

Game 2
All times are local (UTC+10)

References

FIBA Oceania Championship
Championship
2013 in New Zealand basketball
2013–14 in Australian basketball
International basketball competitions hosted by Australia
International basketball competitions hosted by New Zealand
Australia men's national basketball team games
New Zealand men's national basketball team games